The 2019–20 Liga IV Mehedinți was the 52nd season of the Liga IV Mehedinți, the fourth tier of the Romanian football league system.  The season began on 31 August 2019 and was scheduled to end in June 2020, but was suspended in March because of the COVID-19 pandemic in Romania.
The season was concluded officially on 23 July 2020 when AJF Mehedinți decided to freeze the championship and declare the team ranked first, Recolta Dănceu, county champion.

Because Recolta Dănceu does not have C.I.S.(Certificate of sports identity) issued by the Ministry of Youth and Sports required to play in Liga III, Strehaia was designated as the representative of Mehedinți County at the promotion play-off.

Team changes

To Liga IV Mehedinți
Relegated from Liga III
 —Promoted from Liga V Mehedinți —

From Liga IV MehedințiPromoted to Liga III —Relegated to Liga V Mehedinți'''
 —

Other changes
 Decebal Eșelnița and Dunărea Pristol did not enter in the competition.
 Unirea Gârla Mare and Cerna Baia de Aramă were enrolled in Liga IV due to the lack of teams.

League table

Promotion play-off

Champions of Liga IV – Mehedinți County face champions of Liga IV – Hunedoara County and Liga IV – Timiș County.

Region 4 (West)

Group B

See also

Main Leagues
 2019–20 Liga I
 2019–20 Liga II
 2019–20 Liga III
 2019–20 Liga IV

County Leagues (Liga IV series)

 2019–20 Liga IV Alba
 2019–20 Liga IV Arad
 2019–20 Liga IV Argeș
 2019–20 Liga IV Bacău
 2019–20 Liga IV Bihor 
 2019–20 Liga IV Bistrița-Năsăud
 2019–20 Liga IV Botoșani
 2019–20 Liga IV Brăila
 2019–20 Liga IV Brașov
 2019–20 Liga IV Bucharest
 2019–20 Liga IV Buzău
 2019–20 Liga IV Călărași
 2019–20 Liga IV Caraș-Severin
 2019–20 Liga IV Cluj
 2019–20 Liga IV Constanța
 2019–20 Liga IV Covasna
 2019–20 Liga IV Dâmbovița
 2019–20 Liga IV Dolj
 2019–20 Liga IV Galați
 2019–20 Liga IV Giurgiu
 2019–20 Liga IV Giurgiu
 2019–20 Liga IV Harghita
 2019–20 Liga IV Hunedoara
 2019–20 Liga IV Ialomița
 2019–20 Liga IV Iași
 2019–20 Liga IV Ilfov
 2019–20 Liga IV Maramureș
 2019–20 Liga IV Mureș
 2019–20 Liga IV Neamț
 2019–20 Liga IV Olt
 2019–20 Liga IV Prahova
 2019–20 Liga IV Sălaj
 2019–20 Liga IV Satu Mare
 2019–20 Liga IV Sibiu
 2019–20 Liga IV Suceava
 2019–20 Liga IV Teleorman
 2019–20 Liga IV Timiș
 2019–20 Liga IV Tulcea
 2019–20 Liga IV Vâlcea
 2019–20 Liga IV Vaslui
 2019–20 Liga IV Vrancea

References

External links
 Official website 

Liga IV seasons
Sport in Mehedinți County